Predmost is a settlement on the right bank of the Poljane Sora River, located next to Poljane in the Municipality of Gorenja Vas–Poljane in the Upper Carniola region of Slovenia.

References

External links 

Predmost on Geopedia

Populated places in the Municipality of Gorenja vas-Poljane